Antidesma jayasuriyae, is a species of plant in the family Phyllanthaceae. It is endemic to island of Sri Lanka.

References

Endemic flora of Sri Lanka
jayasuriyae